The NMBS/SNCB Type 1 was a class of  steam locomotives built in 1935 and 1938 for working heavy express passenger trains operated by the National Railway Company of Belgium (NMBS/SNCB).

Design, construction and service history

Thirty five type 1 locomotives were built by the Société Anonyme la Métallurgique at its Tubize factory. They had a high degree of superheat, and a firebox that was so wide, it had two firehole doors. The members of the class were retired in 1962.

One locomotive, no. 1.002, has been preserved by the NMBS/SNCB. It is displayed at the Treignes railway museum of heritage railway CFV3V (Chemin de fer à vapeur des trois vallées) in the far south of Belgium.

References

External links

4-6-2 locomotives
01
Railway locomotives introduced in 1935
Type 01
Standard gauge locomotives of Belgium
2′C1′ h4 locomotives